Casanova is the seventh studio album of Rondò Veneziano. The international album is famous as Odissea veneziana.

Track listing

Casanova 

Casanova (Gian Piero Reverberi e Laura Giordano) - 3:08
Donna Lucrezia (Gian Piero Reverberi e Laura Giordano) - 3:00
Nuovi orizzonti (Gian Piero Reverberi e Laura Giordano) - 3:14
Nostalgia di Venezia (Gian Piero Reverberi e Laura Giordano) - 2:29
Rosaura (Gian Piero Reverberi e Laura Giordano) - 2:38
Giardino incantato (Gian Piero Reverberi e Laura Giordano) - 5:14
Sogno veneziano (Gian Piero Reverberi e Laura Giordano) - 3:17
Bettina (Gian Piero Reverberi e Laura Giordano) - 3:10
Preludio all'amore (Gian Piero Reverberi e Laura Giordano) - 2:58
L'orientale (Gian Piero Reverberi e Laura Giordano) - 3:41
Interludio (Gian Piero Reverberi e Laura Giordano) - 3:16
Cecilia (Gian Piero Reverberi e Laura Giordano) - 3:43

Odissea veneziana 
 Odissea veneziana (Gian Piero Reverberi e Dario Farina) - 2:34
 Sogno veneziano (Gian Piero Reverberi e Laura Giordano) - 3:14
 Bettina (Gian Piero Reverberi e Laura Giordano) - 3:09
 Preludio all'amore (Gian Piero Reverberi e Laura Giordano) - 2:57
 L'orientale (Gian Piero Reverberi e Laura Giordano) - 3:39
 Interludio (Gian Piero Reverberi e Laura Giordano) - 3:16
 Cecilia (Gian Piero Reverberi e Laura Giordano) - 3:15
 Casanova (Gian Piero Reverberi e Laura Giordano) - 3:06
 Donna Lucrezia (Gian Piero Reverberi e Laura Giordano) - 2:59
 Nuovi orizzonti (Gian Piero Reverberi e Laura Giordano) - 3:13
 Nostalgia di Venezia (Gian Piero Reverberi e Laura Giordano) - 2:27
 Rosaura (Gian Piero Reverberi e Laura Giordano) - 2:37
 Giardino incantato (Gian Piero Reverberi e Laura Giordano) - 5:13
 Rosso veneziano (Gian Piero Reverberi e Laura Giordano) - 3:03

References

1985 albums
Rondò Veneziano albums